Přehýšov is a municipality and village in Plzeň-North District in the Plzeň Region of the Czech Republic. It has about 500 inhabitants.

Administrative parts
Villages of Bítov and Radějovice are administrative parts of Přehýšov.

References

Villages in Plzeň-North District